Stockton is a suburb of Newcastle, New South Wales, Australia, located  from Newcastle's central business district. It is the only residential suburb of the City of Newcastle that lies north of the Hunter River.

Geography 
Stockton is a peninsula, with the Hunter River at the south and south-west and the Pacific Ocean at the east. On the eastern side are sand dunes and surfing beaches, with numerous shipwrecks at its north, while on the western side there are marshes, where many migratory birds can be spotted. There are numerous spots at Stockton suitable for recreational fishing.

For many years, Stockton was linked to Newcastle's central business district at the south by passenger and vehicular ferry services. While there is still a passenger ferry service, vehicular traffic is now connected by the Stockton Bridge, built in 1971.

History 
The Aboriginal people, in this area, the Worimi, were the first people of this land. The Worimi people call the area Burrabihngarn.

Stockton was settled almost as soon as the foundation of Newcastle in 1797. It was originally called "Pirate Point" as the result of escaped convicts who stole the Norfolk which shipwrecked on the peninsula in 1800. The southern tip of the peninsula, near the northern breakwater is still known as "Pirate Point". For much of the 19th century it served as an industrial and mining base. In 1896 tragedy struck when a gas leak killed 11 people in the Stockton Colliery Disaster. It has become a working-class dormitory suburb during the 20th century, and remains so today for its 4,200 residents.

Stocktonians are particularly proud of Dave Sands, a local resident and champion boxer during the years immediately after World War II. Like the Colliery Disaster, the short life of Sands was commemorated by some of the numerous memorials across this seaside village.

Stockton Beach is also known as the location of the 1989 rape and murder of Newcastle High School student and Fern Bay resident Leigh Leigh. A play, Blackrock (written by Australian playwright Nick Enright), and also a film of the same name, were inspired by this event.

Culture 
Despite being technically an inner-city suburb of Newcastle, Stockton has a country town atmosphere because of its isolation. It has its own shops, churches, two clubhouses, three pubs, a swimming pool, and a caravan park. It also had a large residential unit for people with developmental disability known as the Stockton Centre, a public primary school and a Catholic primary school. High school students catch the ferry or bus to go to schools in the city of Newcastle.

Stockton was traditionally a working-class suburb. The Leigh Leigh murder caused "irreparable psychological damage" to the community of Stockton. The crime has been described as a barely healed wound for Stockton, one that is easily punctured. In recent years, however, the town has begun to re-invent itself with a push for young professionals to move in from other centres such as Sydney. This practice has led to an increase in real estate prices.

Sport 
Stockton includes a district cricket team. It also has an active soccer club, the Stockton Sharks Soccer Club. The Stockton Rugby League club participates in the Newcastle & Hunter Rugby League C Grade competition. Surfing is a big part of Stockton life and is based from the Stockton Surf Life Saving Club (SLSC). Activities around the SLSC include paddle boarding, surf swimming, surf ski, as well as surf life saving beach patrols. Port Hunter 16 Foot Sailing Skiff Club sails on Newcastle harbour.

Stockton Beach 

In some areas it is as much as 1 km wide and has sand dunes over 30 metres high although at the Stockton end it is at its narrowest.

Four-wheel drives are permitted to drive on most areas of Stockton Beach but are excluded from the extreme ends of the beach.

Entry to the beach is via Lavis Lane or Anna Bay and a permit needs to be purchased before entering the beach. Drivers must also ensure that they respect the natural habitat of the beach and refrain from driving on the plants and grasses on dune structure.

Transport 
There is a frequent passenger ferry service to Stockton from Queens Wharf, close to the former Newcastle railway station. The ferry journey takes about three minutes. Wheelchair access is available, and you can take a bicycle onto the ferry for free. Driving to Stockton from Newcastle requires following the many signs to Port Stephens that can be found on the main roads. These will eventually lead to the Stockton Bridge and a turn-off to the suburb itself.

Gallery

Notes

References

External links 

 

Suburbs of Newcastle, New South Wales
Hunter River (New South Wales)